Then and Now is a studio album by American jazz saxophonist Grover Washington Jr. The record was released in 1988 through Columbia Records.

Reception
Scott Yanow of AllMusic wrote "This is one of Grover Washington Jr.'s occasional strays away from R&B-oriented jazz to play in a more straightahead setting. Switching between soprano, alto and tenor, Grover is accompanied by either Tommy Flanagan or Herbie Hancock on piano during five of the eight selections and he performs such numbers as Ron Carter's "Blues for D.P.," "Stolen Moments" and "Stella by Starlight" with swing and taste. Tenor-saxophonist Igor Butman also helps out on three songs. Worth acquiring".

Track listing
"Blues for D. P." (Ron Carter) – 8:30
"Just Enough" (Herbie Hancock) – 5:44
"French Connections" (Igor Butman) – 7:00
"Something Borrowed, Something Blue" (Tommy Flanagan) – 8:00
"Lullaby for Shana Bly" (Washington) – 6:12
"Stolen Moments" (Oliver Nelson) – 7:25
"In a Sentimental Mood" (Duke Ellington, Manny Kurtz, Irving Mills) – 7:03
"Stella by Starlight" (Ned Washington, Victor Young) – 6:40

Personnel 
 Grover Washington Jr. – soprano saxophone (1, 6, 8), tenor saxophone (2-5), alto saxophone (7)
 Igor Butman – tenor saxophone (3, 6, 8)
 Herbie Hancock – grand piano (1, 2, 5)
 James "Sid" Simmons – grand piano (3, 6, 8)
 Tommy Flanagan – grand piano (4, 7)
 Richard Lee Steacker – guitars (3, 6)
 Ron Carter – double bass (1, 2, 5)
 Gerald Veasley – 5-string electric bass (3, 6, 8)
 Grady Tate – drums (1)
 Marvin "Smitty" Smith – drums (1, 2, 5)
 Darryl Washington – drums (3, 6, 8)
 Miguel Fuentes – percussion (3, 6, 8)

Production 
 Grover Washington Jr. – producer, mixing  
 Fernando Kral – recording 
 Joe Tarsia – recording, mixing 
 Tony Maserati – assistant engineer 
 Adam Silverman – assistant engineer 
 Peter Humphreys – mastering 
 Nimitr Sarkananda – mastering 
 Masterworks Recording, Inc. (Philadelphia, Pennsylvania)  – mastering location 
 Paul Silverthorn – production coordinator 
 Rico Lins – art direction, design 
 David Katzenstein – photography 
 Charles Morotta – fashion coordinator, wardrobe 
 Lawrence Morotta – fashion coordinator, wardrobe 
 Toyce Anderson – stylist 
 Sandra Murphy – make-up

References

Grover Washington Jr. albums
1988 albums
Columbia Records albums